Adrian Meikle (born 17 March 1965) is a Welsh curler and member of the Wales Men's Curling Team that takes part in the European Curling Championships. He is also a member of the Welsh Mixed Doubles and Senior Team.

He won a gold medal at the 2007 European Mixed Curling Championship as a skip.

Personal life
He is a son of Hugh Meikle, Welsh curler and one of the founders of Welsh Curling Association.

References

External links

1965 births
Living people
Welsh male curlers
European curling champions